Harvey Worthington Loomis (February 5, 1865, Brooklyn, New York – December 25, 1930, Boston, Massachusetts) was an American composer.  He is remembered today for his associations with the Indianist movement and the Wa-Wan Press.

Biography
Loomis was born in Brooklyn, New York, on February 5, 1865. He studied piano with Madeline Schiller. In his youth he won a scholarship of three years' study at the National Conservatory, where he studied with Antonín Dvořák, and quickly became a favored pupil of the Bohemian composer.  He gained his greatest fame from the collection Lyrics of the Red Man, settings of American Indian songs rescored for piano.  Loomis also composed works for children; also in his catalog may be found numerous stage works, including comic operas and pantomimes; sonatas for violin and for piano; and incidental music to numerous stage plays.  Little of his music has been committed to disc, although some of the Lyrics may be found on a recording of Indianist piano music released by Naxos Records on the Marco Polo label.

Loomis died on Christmas Day, December 25, 1930.

Works
 The Mandolin, opera
 The Song of the Pear, melodrama
 The Story of a Faithful Soul, melodrama
 The Maid of Athens, comic opera
 The Burglar's Bride, comic opera
 Going Up?, comic opera
 The Bey of Baba, comic opera
 Put to the Test, musical pantomime
 In Old New Amsterdam, musical pantomime
 The Enchanted Fountain, musical pantomime
 Love and Witchcraft, musical pantomime
 Blanc et Noir, musical pantomime
Moonlight Serenade (for SAB choir; text by J. Lilian Vandevere; melody by Riccardo Drigo; arr. by Loomis)

Notes and references

External links

 

1865 births
1930 deaths
American male classical composers
Musicians from Brooklyn
Pupils of Antonín Dvořák
19th-century classical composers
19th-century American composers
20th-century classical composers
American classical composers
20th-century American composers
19th-century American male musicians
20th-century American male musicians